Mats Julian Hummels (born 16 December 1988) is a German professional footballer who plays as a centre-back for Bundesliga club Borussia Dortmund and the Germany national team.

He came through the Bayern Munich youth academy before joining Borussia Dortmund on loan in January 2008 and officially signing for Dortmund in February 2009 for €4 million. His career highlights at the club include two league titles and finishing as the runner-up in the 2012–13 UEFA Champions League. In May 2016, Hummels signed a contract with former side Bayern, which took effect on 1 July 2016.

Hummels has been part of the German national team since 2010, earning over 70 caps to date and representing Germany at the 2014 and 2018 FIFA World Cups, and at UEFA Euro 2012, 2016 and 2020.

Club career

Bayern Munich: Youth, and 2006–2008
Hummels is a product of Bayern Munich's youth academy, first entering the club as a six-year-old. He signed his first professional contract on 19 December 2006, until 2010. On 19 May 2007, in the season's final match, he played his first Bundesliga match with the first team in a 5–2 home routing of 1. FSV Mainz 05. He also played for the reserve team. He played in one match during the 2005–06 season, 31 matches during the 2006–07 season, and 10 matches during the 2007–08 season.

Borussia Dortmund: 2008–2016

In January 2008, Hummels joined Borussia Dortmund, initially on loan. He finished the 2007–08 season with 16 matches played. During his first full season, he quickly established himself as first-choice, as he often partnered newly signed Neven Subotić, but also missed a great part of its final months due to injury. In February 2009, he was fully signed to the club for a fee of €4 million. He finished the 2008–09 season with a goal in 14 matches played. During the following season, Hummels scored five goals in 33 matches played.

The 2010–11 season brought increased success for Hummels. He was the regular first-choice centre-back, again paired with Subotić. The duo helped Dortmund to the best defensive record in the Bundesliga, as the team won the league title. Hummels' performances that season displayed great quality in tackling, positioning, passing and composure. He attracted praise from pundits and coaches alike, and he was considered one of the best defenders in the Bundesliga, and in Europe. Hummels finished the 2010–11 season with six goals in 42 matches played.

Hummels won the Bundesliga for a second time in 2011–12 as Dortmund set a Bundesliga record with the most points in a Bundesliga season with 81 points. Hummels scored a goal in Dortmund's 5–2 win against Bayern in the 2012 DFB-Pokal Final as the team completed the league and cup double. On 3 June 2012, Hummels signed a new contract that will keep him at Dortmund until the summer of 2017.

On 25 May 2013, Hummels was in the Borussia Dortmund line-up that was defeated 2–1 by Bayern Munich at Wembley Stadium, London, in the 2013 UEFA Champions League Final.

On 27 July 2013, Hummels was in the Borussia Dortmund line-up that won 4–2 against Bayern Munich at BVB's Signal Iduna Park, Dortmund, in the 2013 DFL-Supercup.

Hummels finished his Borussia Dortmund career with two goals in 32 matches played in the 2014–15 season and three goals in 50 matches played during the 2015–16 season.

Return to Bayern Munich

2016–17 season
On 10 May 2016, it was confirmed that Hummels would re-join Bayern Munich from 1 July 2016, signing a five-year contract. He made his 2016 debut for Bayern on 14 August 2016 in the German Super Cup final, against his old team and winning 2–0. On 20 August, Hummels scored his first goal for the club in a 5–0 victory over Carl Zeiss Jena during the DFB-Pokal match. On 26 November, Hummels scored his first league goal for the club in a 2–1 win over Bayer Leverkusen. On 24 September, Hummels suffered knee injury in his right knee just before half time and was subbed off in a 1–0 victory over Hamburger SV. He made his comeback as a substitute in the second half in a 1–0 defeat to Atlético Madrid on 29 September. On 11 March 2017, Hummels made a world class goal-saving tackle on Eintracht Frankfurt's Branimir Hrgota by making an amazing run towards him and denied him to score from a clear chance. On 9 April, Hummels missed the Champions League quarter-final first leg against Real Madrid after sustaining an ankle injury in training. On 19 April, he did not fully recover from the injury and had to play the second leg against Real Madrid as defender Javi Martínez was shown red card in the first leg and there was no more backup player in centre-back position, but the match ended 4–2 defeat for his side as they got knocked out from the competition. On 26 April, Hummels scored a goal against his former club Borussia Dortmund in a 2–3 loss in the DFB-Pokal semi-final. He finished the 2016–17 season with three goals and two assists in his forty-one matches. Hummels finished the 2016–17 season with three goals in 42 matches played.

2017–18 season

On 5 August 2017, Hummels started the season in fashion by defeating Borussia Dortmund to win the DFL-Supercup in the penalty-shootout as the match ended 2–2 after extra time. He scored his first goal of the season in a 5–0 victory over Chemnitzer FC in the DFB-Pokal on 12 August. On 1 October, Hummels scored a goal in a 2–2 draw over Hertha BSC. On 18 October, he scored his first Champions League goal for the club in a 3–0 victory over Celtic. Hummels sustained an adductor injury at Bayern's training camp in Doha during the winter break which forced him to miss the league match against Bayer Leverkusen. On 2 February, Hummels played his first match of the year after recovering from the injury in a 2–0 victory over Mainz 05. On 31 March, he made his 50th league appearance for Bayern Munich in a 6–0 victory over Borussia Dortmund. On 28 April, Hummels captained his side for the first time in a 4–1 victory over Eintracht Frankfurt. He finished the season with scoring three goals and provided one assist in his forty appearances. Hummels finished the 2017–18 season with three goals in 41 matches played.

2018–19 season

Hummels started the 2018–19 season by starting in the German Super Cup, which Bayern won 5–0.

Hummels had a difficult spell midway through the season as he lost his starting place for several matches. Hummels was criticized for his comments after the 3–2 loss against Dortmund on 10 November 2018. Hummels blamed his poor performance on him being sick. Hummels said he had blurred vision before the match but he still decided to play the match. Hummels had to be substituted in the second half because of his poor performance.

On 18 May 2019, Hummels won his fifth Bundesliga title as Bayern finished two points above Dortmund with 78 points. A week later, Hummels won his second DFB-Pokal as Bayern defeated RB Leipzig 3–0 in the 2019 DFB-Pokal Final.

Hummels finished the 2018–19 season with two goals in 33 matches played.

Return to Dortmund

2019–20 season
On 19 June 2019, Bayern Munich came to an agreement with Borussia Dortmund that would see the 30-year-old rejoin his former club, for a fee of €37 million (£33 million). He finished his time in Bavaria with 8 goals in 116 appearances. Within those three seasons, he won all three Bundesliga campaigns as well as the DFB-Pokal and three DFL-Supercups.

International career

Hummels was called by the German under-21 national team for the 2009 UEFA European Under-21 Championship; after getting only minimal playing time during the initial four matches, he started (and performed well) in the final, a 4–0 success against England.

He made his senior team debut in a friendly against Malta on 13 May 2010 in Aachen. He came on as a 46th-minute substitute for Serdar Tasci, taking part in a 3–0 win at New Tivoli.

Hummels was in the starting line-up for Germany's opening UEFA Euro 2012 match against Portugal and helped them to a 1–0 victory. He subsequently received high praise for his performance. Hummels went on to play all 450 minutes in Germany's Euro campaign, along with teammates Philipp Lahm, Sami Khedira, Bastian Schweinsteiger, Holger Badstuber, and Manuel Neuer.

Hummels scored the second goal in Germany's 4–0 win over Portugal in their first game of the 2014 FIFA World Cup on 16 June, heading a corner from Toni Kroos. After missing the team's round of 16 match due to illness, Hummels returned to the team for the quarter-final against France, where he scored the winning goal in a 1–0 victory at the Estádio do Maracanã.

On 11 July 2014, Hummels was named on the 10-man shortlist for FIFA's Golden Ball award for the tournament's best player.

On 10 November 2017, Hummels captained Germany for the first time in a 0–0 draw with England at Wembley Stadium.

On 4 June 2018, Hummels was named in Germany's final 23-man squad for the 2018 FIFA World Cup. On 23 June, he missed the second group stage match of the tournament due to a minor injury though his side won the match against Sweden with a 2–1 victory. He returned to the side for the final group fixture against South Korea on 27 June, but missed several chances from headers after moving up front during the second half in Germany's unsuccessful attempts to score; ultimately they were defeated 2–0 and eliminated from the tournament.

On 5 March 2019, national team coach Joachim Löw confirmed that he would plan without Hummels for the foreseeable future, along with his club teammates Jérôme Boateng and Thomas Müller.

On 19 May 2021, Hummels, along with Müller, was included in Germany's final 26-man squad for UEFA Euro 2020, confirming Low's reversal of his decision to exclude the players from the national side. In his first match of Euro 2020, Hummels scored an own goal to grant France a 1–0 win, which was Germany's first own goal in the competition, and the first in a major tournament since Berti Vogts' own goal in the 1978 FIFA World Cup. In November 2022, he was not named in the 26-man squad for Germany for the 2022 FIFA World Cup in Qatar.

Style of play
Regarded as one of the best defenders in the world, Hummels is a large, consistent, and physically strong player, known for his powerful tackling and strength in the air, as well as his ability to read the game and intercept loose balls. A technically gifted and tactically versatile centre-back, he is also capable of playing as a defensive midfielder; his composure, elegance, ball playing ability, and confidence in possession have led him to be compared to compatriot Franz Beckenbauer.

Personal life
Hummels was born in Bergisch Gladbach, North Rhine-Westphalia. His father, Hermann Hummels, was a professional footballer and manager. His mother, was a professional water polo player. His father worked as youth coordinator at Bayern Munich until he was replaced by Stephan Beckenbauer, the son of Franz Beckenbauer, on 30 March 2012. His younger brother Jonas is also a footballer, but had to retire due to injuries.

His wife, was named as Germany's WAG of the year for 2013. Fischer and Hummels married in June 2015. The couple have a son, born on 11 January 2018.

In August 2017, he joined the Common Goal Project (an initiative of Juan Mata), being the second footballer to donate 1% of his salary to a collective fund that will support football organizations as a tool to generate sustainable social development throughout the world.

On 16 November 2022, his wife Cathy Hummels announced via her Instagram account that they are divorced.

Career statistics

Club

International

Honours
Borussia Dortmund
 Bundesliga: 2010–11, 2011–12
 DFB-Pokal: 2011–12, 2020–21
 DFL-Supercup: 2013, 2014, 2019
 UEFA Champions League runner-up: 2012–13

Bayern Munich
 Bundesliga: 2016–17, 2017–18, 2018–19
 DFB-Pokal: 2018–19
 DFL-Supercup: 2016, 2017, 2018

Germany U21
 UEFA European Under-21 Championship: 2009

Germany
 FIFA World Cup: 2014

Individual
 ESM Team of the Year: 2010–11, 2011–12
 FIFA World Cup All-Star Team: 2014
 FIFA World Cup Dream Team: 2014
 Castrol Performance Index: 2014 FIFA World Cup (Top 11)
 UEFA Europa League Squad of the Season: 2015–16
 kicker Bundesliga Team of the Season: 2009–10, 2010–11, 2011–12, 2013–14, 2015–16, 2017–18, 2019–20
 Bundesliga Team of the Season: 2012–13, 2013–14, 2015–16, 2016–17, 2017–18, 2020–21

References

External links

 
 Profile at the Borussia Dortmund website
  
 
 
 
 
 

1988 births
Living people
People from Bergisch Gladbach
Sportspeople from Cologne (region)
Footballers from North Rhine-Westphalia
German footballers
Germany youth international footballers
Germany under-21 international footballers
Germany international footballers
Association football defenders
FC Bayern Munich II players
FC Bayern Munich footballers
Borussia Dortmund players
Regionalliga players
Bundesliga players
UEFA Euro 2012 players
2014 FIFA World Cup players
UEFA Euro 2016 players
2018 FIFA World Cup players
UEFA Euro 2020 players
FIFA World Cup-winning players